Eric H. Kearney (born 1963) is an American Democratic politician who served as the state senator for the 9th District in the Ohio Senate.

Life and career
In 1981, Kearney graduated from St. Xavier High School in Cincinnati. He later received his Juris Doctor from the University of Cincinnati Law School, and his Bachelor of Arts in English from Dartmouth College. Kearney cofounded Sesh Communications, one of the largest African American–owned publishing companies in the area, which produces The Cincinnati Herald, The Dayton Defender, and Our Week. He is a partner in the law firm of Cohen, Todd, Kite & Standford, LLC.

Ohio Senate
When incumbent Mark Mallory resigned from the Senate, Kearney as well as Catherine Barrett, Tyrone Yates, Steve Driehaus, David Pepper and Alicia Reece all were in the running to replace him. However, Senate Democrats decided on Kearney to ultimately take the appointment.

Only months into his appointed term, Kearney again faced Barrett in the primary election.  However, only weeks before the primary election day, Barrett dropped out of the race, securing Kearney as the Democratic nominee. In the general election Kearney went on to face Republican Tom Brown.  While the index favored Democrats, precautions were still taken due to the seat being lost only two cycles earlier to Republican Janet C. Howard. However, Kearney went on to defeat Brown by 34,000 votes.

For the 127th General Assembly, Kearney was appointed by Minority Leader Teresa Fedor to the Senate Finance and Financial Institutions Committee. He also was selected to serve as treasurer of the Ohio Legislative Black Caucus. In his first full term, Kearney also began his annual walk from Cincinnati to the Ohio Statehouse to underscore their commitment to fighting childhood obesity and supporting physical education.

In the 2010 election cycle, Kearney faced Republican Deborah McKenney in the general election, but won a second term by about 32,000 votes.   In January 2012, Kearney was elected Minority Leader of the Senate, succeeding Capri Cafaro.

Kearney served as Minority Leader for the 130th General Assembly. On November 20, 2013, Democratic gubernatorial candidate Ed FitzGerald picked Kearney to be his running mate.  On December 10, Kearney stepped down from the ticket due to increasing controversy surrounding back taxes owed by himself and his wife, for which they blamed financial difficulties at the Herald.

Kearney was featured in the 2016 documentary The Student Body for his sponsorship of S.B. 210, a bill requiring Ohio schools to administer BMI tests to their students. Although an interview did occur, Kearney's reticence towards being interviewed was featured prominently in the film. Kearney voiced his continued support for these policies.

Electoral history

Personal life
Kearney is married to Jan-Michele Kearney and together they have two children, Celeste and Asher.  They live in Cincinnati.

References

External links
The Ohio Senate: Senator Eric Kearney (D) - District 9
Eric Kearney for Senate, official campaign website
Eric H. Kearney at Project Vote Smart
Follow the Money - Eric Kerney
2006 campaign contributions

Democratic Party Ohio state senators
Politicians from Cincinnati
St. Xavier High School (Ohio) alumni
1963 births
Living people
African-American state legislators in Ohio
21st-century American politicians
21st-century African-American politicians
20th-century African-American people